The Three Evangelists (Debout les Morts) is a 1995 novel by French author Fred Vargas, translated into English in 2006. It won the inaugural Crime Writers' Association's  Duncan Lawrie International Dagger, now known as the International Dagger Award.

Plot
The "three evangelists" of the title are Marc Vandoosler, Mathias Dellamarre and Lucien Devernois, and Marc's uncle, the former, disgraced police commissioner Armand Vandoosler, appearing for the first time in this book. All three  are historians. Marc studies the Middle Ages; Matthias, a historian of prehistoric man; and Lucien, a historian of World War I. All three historians are down on their luck, and decide to move into an old house, neighboring Sophia Siméonidis.

One morning, retired opera singer Sophia Siméonidis discovers a beech tree in her garden that she has never seen before. Sophia is alarmed, but her husband Pierre is indifferent.  Eventually she calls upon her neighbors, Marc, Matthias, and Lucien, and asks their help. They dig out the tree, and find nothing underneath it.

Sophia disappears.  Pierre remains unconcerned, as he believes she has gone to visit an old, Greek lover, Stelyos.  But Juliette, the evangelists' other next door neighbor, expresses concern; she is sure that Sophia, her best friend, would never have gone off without telling her, and especially not on a Thursday evening, when all the neighbors regularly meet for a convivial meal at Juliette's restaurant, Le Tonneau (The Barrel).

One night, Sophia's niece, Alexandra, arrives with her little boy Cyrille, running away from a failed relationship and expecting to stay with Sophia.  Shortly afterward, a burned out car with a corpse is discovered in an abandoned factory yard. The body is  unidentifiable, but a small piece of basalt is found, which was Sophia's lucky charm.  Alexandra has no alibi, she stands to inherit a third of Sophia's substantial fortune, and her habit of driving aimlessly around at night makes her a principal suspect.

Already troubled by the enigma of the tree, and increasingly desperate to divert the attention of the police from Alexandra, the three evangelists and Armand Vandoosler start to investigate, exploiting Armand's contacts with his former colleagues.

Release details
2006, Canada, Vintage Canada , Pub date 14 Feb 2006, Paperback
1995, France, V. Hamy , Pub date ?? ? 1995, Unknown binding

1995 French novels
Novels by Fred Vargas
Novels set in Paris